Lindsay Williams (born 22 April 1946) is a British retired slalom canoeist who competed in the 1970s. He finished 15th in the C-2 event at the 1972 Summer Olympics in Munich.

References
Sports-reference.com profile

1946 births
Canoeists at the 1972 Summer Olympics
Living people
Olympic canoeists of Great Britain
British male canoeists
Place of birth missing (living people)